The 2015–16 Saint Kitts Premier Division or alternatively known as the SKNFA Digicel Super League for sponsorship reasons, is the 36th season of the Saint Kitts Premier Division. The regular season began on 10 October 2015 and concluded on 15 May 2016. The Final Four playoffs began on 21 May 2016, with the final series ending on 17 June 2016. Cayon Rockets won the title, earning their first SKNFA Super League title since 2003.

Clubs 

Bath United
Cayon Rockets
Conaree (Basseterre)
Garden Hotspurs (Basseterre)
Newtown United (Basseterre)
Rivers of Living Water
SPD United
St. Paul's United (St. Paul's)
St. Peters Strikers (St. Peters)
Village Superstars (Champsville)

Table

Playoffs

Final four

Championship final 
Best of three series

Cayon wins the series 2–1

References 

1
Saint Kitts and Nevis
SKNFA Super League seasons